"Harlem Nocturne" is a jazz standard written by Earle Hagen (music) and Dick Rogers (lyrics) in 1939 for the Ray Noble orchestra, of which they were members. The song was chosen by the big-band leader Randy Brooks the next year as his theme song.

The version by the Viscounts has the distinction of being released twice and rising high on the Billboard charts each time: first in 1959, when it peaked at #53, and again in 1966, peaking at #39 on the Billboard Hot 100 chart.

"Harlem Nocturne", in a version with Bud Shank on alto sax, was the theme song of the television series Mickey Spillane's Mike Hammer and The New Mike Hammer.

Harold Faltermeyer recorded a version for the soundtrack to the film Tango & Cash.

In 1990, the pianist Kofi Wilmot gained popularity in the instrumental world for his cover version from the album of the same name, Harlem Nocturne.

Danny Gatton released a version in 1993 on his album Cruisin' Deuces (Elektra/Rhino).

The Sonny Moorman Group released a version on their 2009 Live As Hell album (Atlas Records).

Shadowy Men on a Shadowy Planet recorded a version on their 1987 7" single "Schlagers!" (and included it on their 1988 LP Savvy Show Stoppers) entitled "Harlem by the Sea."

Some singers have recorded "Harlem Nocturne", adding lyrics. Mel Tormé recorded a version with lyrics for his 1963 album Sings "Sunday In New York" And Other Songs About New York, beginning with "a nocturne for the blues". Sylvia Brooks recorded a different version, arranged by Jeff Colella, on her album Dangerous Liaisons in 2009, starting with "deep music fills the night", which has since been covered. Other vocal versions are by Ernestine Anderson, Carla White, Denise Jannah, Bonnie Bramlett, and Jacintha. Brian Setzer does a version loosely based on the theme called "Hollywood Nocturne".

Renditions

"Harlem Nocturne" has been recorded by many diverse artists, including:

 The 5.6.7.8's
 Eric Alexander
 Ernestine Anderson
 Ray Anthony
 Georgie Auld
 Sil Austin
 Charlie Barnet
 Bill Black
 Earl Bostic
 Randy Brooks & His Orchestra with Eddie Caine on alto sax
 Chuck Brown & The Soul Searchers
 Les Brown & His Band of Renown
 Billy Butterfield
 Jim Campilongo & The 10 Gallon Cats
 Ace Cannon
 Chakachas
 Messer Chups (Russia)
 King Curtis
 Martin Denny
 Mink DeVille
 Sam Donahue
 Lou Donaldson
 Steve Douglas
 Terry Edwards & The Scapegoats (paired in a medley with Lydia Lunch's "Cesspool Called History")
 Les Elgart
 Booker Ervin
 Esquivel
 Harold Faltermeyer
 Herbie Fields 
 Shep Fields
 Flat Duo Jets
 Henry Franklin with Azar Lawrence
 Danny Gatton
 Ray Gelato & The Chevalier Brothers
 Glen Gray
 Richard Greene & The Greene String Quartet
 Bill Haley and His Comets (performed live)
 Eddie Harris
 Ted Heath (UK)
 Woody Herman
 Illinois Jacquet
 Willis Jackson
 Harry James
 Quincy Jones
 Dick Jurgens
 Bill Justis
 Stan Kenton
 The Knickerbockers
 Robby Krieger
 Michael Lington (Denmark)
 John Lurie & The Lounge Lizards
 Ken Mackintosh (UK)
 Herbie Mann
 Mantovani
 Big Jay McNeely
 Glenn Miller Orchestra
 Duke Ellington and his Orchestra
 Sonny Moorman
 Charlie Musselwhite
 Ray Noble
 Johnny Otis & His Orchestra with Rene Bloch on alto sax and Bill Doggett on piano
 Bill Perkins with Frank Strazzeri
 Louis Prima with Sam Butera & The Witnesses
 Quartet San Francisco
 Boots Randolph
 Eric Reed
 David Rose & His Orchestra with Woody Herman on alto sax
 Oliver Sain
 David Sanborn
 Norman Simmons
 Sonny Stitt
 Mel Taylor & The Magics
 Sam "The Man" Taylor
 Toots Thielemans
 Mel Tormé
 Ulrich Tukur & Die Rhythmus Boys (Germany)
 The Ventures
 The Viscounts
 Jerry Vivino
 Carla White with Lew Tabackin
 Mark Whitfield
 Edgar Winter
 Jan Harbeck (Denmark)

References 

1939 songs
1930s jazz standards
American jazz songs
Songs about New York City